= Procholus =

Scientific classification
- Kingdom: Animalia
- Phylum: Arthropoda
- Clade: Pancrustacea
- Class: Insecta
- Order: Coleoptera
- Suborder: Polyphaga
- Infraorder: Cucujiformia
- Superfamily: Curculionoidea
- Family: Curculionidae
- Genus: Procholus; Desbrochers des Loges, J., 1907

Synonyms
- Sphalerocholus Heller, 1908

Genus of weevils

Procholus is a genus of weevils. There are four species assigned to this genus, all of which are provisionally accepted:

- Procholus biplagiatus Champion, G.C., 1909
- Procholus proximus Hustache, 1932
- Procholus pulchellus Chevrolat, L.A.A., 1880
- Procholus sociatus Hustache, A., 1938
